Edmonton Southwest was a federal electoral district in Alberta, Canada, that was represented in the House of Commons of Canada from 1988 to 2003.

Demographics

Geography
It was located in the city of Edmonton in the province of Alberta.

History
This riding was created in 1987 from Edmonton South and Edmonton West ridings.

It was abolished in 2003 when it was redistributed into Edmonton—Leduc, Edmonton—Spruce Grove and Edmonton Centre ridings.

Members of Parliament

This riding elected the following Members of Parliament:

 1993-2000: Ian McClelland - Reform (1993–2000), Canadian Alliance (2000)
 2000-2003: James Rajotte - Canadian Alliance (2000–2003), Progressive Conservative (2003–2004), Conservative (2004-  ) - He currently represents 'Edmonton—Leduc.

Election results

|-

|- bgcolor="white"
!align="right" colspan=3|Total valid votes
!align="right"|48,670
!align="right"|100.00%
!align="right"|
!align="right"|
|- bgcolor="white"
!align="right" colspan=3|Total rejected ballots
!align="right"|111
!align="right"|0.23%
!align="right"|
!align="right"|
|- bgcolor="white"
!align="right" colspan=3|Turnout
!align="right"|48,781
!align="right"|65.08%
!align="right"|
!align="right"|

|-

 
|Liberal
| Esther Starkman
|align="right"|14,833
|align="right"|33.55%
|
|align="right"|$58,880

|Progressive Conservative
|Ellie Shuster
|align="right"|4,403
|align="right"|9.95%
|
|align="right"|$29,078
 
|New Democratic Party
|Richard Vanderberg
|align="right"|2,070
|align="right"|4.68%
|
|align="right"|$3,187

|Natural Law
|Wade McKinley
|align="right"|205
|align="right"|0.46%
|align="right"|
|align="right"|
|- bgcolor="white"
!align="right" colspan=3|Total valid votes
!align="right"|44,208
!align="right"|100.00%
!
!
|- bgcolor="white"
!align="right" colspan=3|Total rejected ballots
!align="right"|67
!align="right"|0.15%
!
!
|- bgcolor="white"
!align="right" colspan=3|Turnout
!align="right"|44,275
!align="right"|62.63%
!
!

See also
 List of Canadian federal electoral districts
 Past Canadian electoral districts

External links
 
 Expenditures - 2000
 Expenditures - 1997
 Elections Canada
 Website of the Parliament of Canada

Former federal electoral districts of Alberta
Politics of Edmonton